Paulus II may refer to:

 Patriarch Paul II of Constantinople (ruled 641 to 653)
 Pope Paul II (1417–1471)